The 1991 Hong Kong Urban Council and Regional Council elections were the municipal elections held on 5 May 1991 for the elected seats of the Urban Council and Regional Council respectively. The election saw the direct rivalry between the newly established political parties, the liberal United Democrats of Hong Kong (UDHK) and the conservative Liberal Democratic Federation of Hong Kong (LDFHK) which the liberal forces won a landslide victory.

Overview
For the Urban Council, 15 seats were the directly elected by the general residents and ten seats were elected by the Hong Kong Island and Kowloon District Boards members and 15 appointed by the Governor. For the Regional Council, 12 seats were directly elected and nine seats were elected by the New Territories District Boards members, with 12 appointed members and three ex officio members of the chairman and two vice-chairmen of the Heung Yee Kuk. The first-past-the-post voting system was in use.

The elections were one of the three elections in the year, which came after the March District Board elections and before the September Legislative Council election in which direct elections would be introduced for the first time. Major political forces realigned themselves on the eve of the elections. The liberal pro-democracy activists and professionals came together as the United Democrats of Hong Kong (UDHK) in preparation for the elections in April 1990, while the conservative pro-business forces founded the Liberal Democratic Federation of Hong Kong (LDFHK) in November 1990 to counter the pro-democracy forces. The United Democrats became the biggest winner in the District Board elections, sweeping 52 seats, as compared to LDF's 24 seats. It was seen as the rehearsals of those parties for the more important Legislative Council election in September.

A total number of 59 candidates contested for 25 seats, excluding the two uncontested seats in each councils. 392,496 electorates cast their votes, which counted more than 23.3 per cent of the total registered voters, about six per cent higher than the elections in 1989. Four of the contesting incumbents were defeated including Peter Chan Chi-kwan who had served for 22 years. The two-term incumbent Wong Shui-sang was also defeated by Gilbert Leung Kam-ho.

The two newly established political parties, the liberal pro-democracy United Democrats, and its allies, and the conservative pro-business Liberal Democratic Federation, with the support of the older grassroots organisation Hong Kong Civic Association, contested heavily in the districts like North Point, Southern District, Kowloon City East, Wong Tai Sin South, Tuen Mun West and Tai Po. The United Democrats won 11 seats as result, more than one-third in each council, including Sha Tin where Lau Kong-wah and Wong Hon-chung both won a seat in preparation for contesting the Legislative Council direct election in September, while the LDF won only three seats.

Results

|-
!style="background-color:#E9E9E9;text-align:center;" colspan=2 rowspan=2|Political Affiliation 
!style="background-color:#E9E9E9;text-align:center;" colspan=3 |Urban Council
!style="background-color:#E9E9E9;text-align:center;" colspan=3 |Regional Council
!style="background-color:#E9E9E9;text-align:center;" colspan=3 |Total
|-
! style="background-color:#E9E9E9;text-align:center;" |Popularvotes
! style="background-color:#E9E9E9;text-align:center;" |Standing
! style="background-color:#E9E9E9;text-align:center;" |Elected
! style="background-color:#E9E9E9;text-align:center;" |Popularvotes
! style="background-color:#E9E9E9;text-align:center;" |Standing
! style="background-color:#E9E9E9;text-align:center;" |Elected
! style="background-color:#E9E9E9;text-align:center;" |Popularvotes
! style="background-color:#E9E9E9;text-align:center;" |%
! style="background-color:#E9E9E9;text-align:center;" |Totalseatsgained
|-
|style="background-color:" |
| style="text-align:left;" |United Democrats of Hong Kong || 66,928 || 8 || 5 || 79,301 || 7 || 6 || 146,229 || 37.33 || 11
|-
|style="background-color:" |
| style="text-align:left;" |Liberal Democratic Federation of Hong Kong || 27,730 || 4 || 2 || 11,409 || 3 || 1 || 39,139 || 9.99 ||3
|-
|style="background-color:" |
| style="text-align:left;" |Hong Kong Civic Association || 22,048 || 5 || 2 || - || - || - || 22,048 || 5.63 || 2
|-
|style="background-color:" |
| style="text-align:left;" |Hong Kong Association for Democracy and People's Livelihood || 21,033 || 2 || 2 || - || - || - || 21,033 || 5.37 || 2
|-
|style="background-color:" |
| style="text-align:left;" | Reform Club of Hong Kong || 9,045 || 2 || 2 || - || - || - || 9,045 || 2.31 || 2
|-
|style="background-color:" |
| style="text-align:left;" |Meeting Point || 12,476 || 1 || 1 || - || - || - || 12,476 || 3.18 || 1
|-
|style="background-color:" |
| style="text-align:left;" |Individuals and others || 82,446 || 18 || 1 || 86,442 || 14 || 5 || 168,888 || 43.11 || 6
|-
|style="text-align:left;background-color:#E9E9E9" colspan="2"|Total
|style="text-align:right;background-color:#E9E9E9"|214,597
|style="text-align:right;background-color:#E9E9E9"|37
|style="text-align:right;background-color:#E9E9E9"|15
|style="text-align:right;background-color:#E9E9E9"|177,152
|style="text-align:right;background-color:#E9E9E9"|24
|style="text-align:right;background-color:#E9E9E9"|12
|style="text-align:right;background-color:#E9E9E9"|391,749
|style="text-align:right;background-color:#E9E9E9"|100.00
|style="text-align:right;background-color:#E9E9E9"|27
|}
Note: Some of the candidates with multiple affiliations are overlapped in this chart.

Result breakdown

Urban Council

Regional Council

References

Hong Kong
1991 in Hong Kong
Urban and Regional
1991 elections in British Overseas Territories
May 1991 events in Asia